The ANAVET Cup is an ice hockey trophy, won through a best-of-seven series conducted annually by the Canadian Junior Hockey League. It is played between the Turnbull Cup champions of the Manitoba Junior Hockey League and the Canalta Cup champions of the Saskatchewan Junior Hockey League. The winner of the ANAVET Cup earns the western region's berth in the Centennial Cup, the national Junior A championship. The series has been contested since 1971, except from 2013 to 2017, when it was replaced by the Western Canada Cup, and from 2020 to 2022, when it was cancelled as a result of the COVID-19 pandemic.

The term "ANAVET" comes from the Canadian non-for-profit organization ANAVETS, or Army, Navy and Air Force Veterans in Canada.

The Western region's ANAVET Cup Champion traditionally played against the Pacific region's Doyle Cup champion for the Abbott Cup, the Western Canadian Championship. However, the Abbott Cup diminished in importance following the reorganization of the national championship in 1990. The Abbott Cup was then presented to the winner of the round-robin game, between the Pacific champion and Western champion, during the larger national competition; this practice ended, and the Abbott Cup was retired, after the 1999 season.

Champions
Champions in bold

{| cellpadding="0"
|- align="left" style="vertical-align: top"
|
{| cellpadding="1" style="font-size: 90%; border: 1px solid gray;"
|- align="center" style="font-size: larger;"
| colspan="5" |Western Junior "A" Champions
|- style="background:lightblue;"
! Year
! MJHL Champion
! SJHL Champion
! Series
|- align="center" style="background:lightblue;"
|- bgcolor=""
|1971	||St. Boniface Saints||Weyburn Red Wings||4–2
|- bgcolor=""
|1972	||Dauphin Kings||Humboldt Broncos||2–4
|- bgcolor=""
|1973	||Portage Terriers||Humboldt Broncos||3–2 (D)
|- bgcolor=""
|1974	||Selkirk Steelers||Prince Albert Raiders||4–2
|- bgcolor=""
|1975	||Selkirk Steelers||Swift Current Broncos||4–0
|- bgcolor=""
|1976	||Selkirk Steelers||Prince Albert Raiders||1–4
|- bgcolor=""
|1977	||Dauphin Kings||Prince Albert Raiders||1–4
|- bgcolor=""
|1978	||Kildonan North Stars||Prince Albert Raiders||0–4
|- bgcolor=""
|1979	||Selkirk Steelers||Prince Albert Raiders||1–4
|- bgcolor=""
|1980	||Selkirk Steelers||Prince Albert Raiders||2–4
|- bgcolor=""
|1981	||St. Boniface Saints||Prince Albert Raiders||1–4
|- bgcolor=""
|1982	||Winnipeg South Blues||Prince Albert Raiders||2–4
|- bgcolor=""
|1983	||Dauphin Kings||Yorkton Terriers||4–1
|- bgcolor=""
|1984	||Selkirk Steelers||Weyburn Red Wings||2–4
|- bgcolor=""
|1985	||Selkirk Steelers||Estevan Bruins||1–4
|- bgcolor=""
|1986	||Winnipeg South Blues||Humboldt Broncos||4–3
|- bgcolor=""
|1987	||Selkirk Steelers||Humboldt Broncos||0–4
|- bgcolor=""
|1988	||Winnipeg South Blues||Notre Dame Hounds||0–4
|- bgcolor=""
|1989	||Winnipeg South Blues||Humboldt Broncos||1–4
|- bgcolor=""
|1990	||Portage Terriers||Nipawin Hawks||2–4
|- bgcolor=""
|1991	||Winkler Flyers||Yorkton Terriers||1–4
|- bgcolor=""
|1992	||Winkler Flyers||Melfort Mustangs||4–1
|- bgcolor=""
|1993	||Dauphin Kings||Flin Flon Bombers||2–4
|- bgcolor=""
|1994	||St. Boniface Saints||Weyburn Red Wings||3–4
|- bgcolor=""
|1995	||Winnipeg South Blues||Weyburn Red Wings||4–2
|- bgcolor=""
|1996	||St. James Canadians||Melfort Mustangs||0–4
|- bgcolor=""
|1997	||St. James Canadians||Weyburn Red Wings||1–4
|- bgcolor=""
|1998	||Winkler Flyers||Weyburn Red Wings||3–4
|- bgcolor=""
|1999	||OCN Blizzard||Estevan Bruins||2–4
|- bgcolor=""
|2000	||OCN Blizzard||North Battleford North Stars||1–4
|- bgcolor=""
|2001	||OCN Blizzard||Weyburn Red Wings||2–4
|- bgcolor=""
|2002	||OCN Blizzard||Kindersley Klippers||4–1
|- bgcolor=""
|2003	||OCN Blizzard||Humboldt Broncos||1–4
|- bgcolor=""
|2004	||Selkirk Steelers||Kindersley Klippers||3–4
|- bgcolor=""
|2005	||Portage Terriers||Yorkton Terriers||4–2
|- bgcolor=""
|2006	||Winnipeg South Blues||Yorkton Terriers||1–4
|- bgcolor=""
|2007	||Selkirk Steelers||Humboldt Broncos||4–3
|- bgcolor=""
|2008	||Portage Terriers||Humboldt Broncos||0–4
|- bgcolor=""
|2009	||Portage Terriers||Humboldt Broncos||3–4
|- bgcolor=""
|2010 ||Dauphin Kings||La Ronge Ice Wolves||4–1
|- bgcolor=""
|2011 ||Portage Terriers||La Ronge Ice Wolves||4–3
|- bgcolor=""
|2012 ||Portage Terriers||Humboldt Broncos||3–4
|- align="center" bgcolor="#eeeeee"
| colspan="4" |2013-2017: replaced by Western Canada Cup
|- 
|2018 ||Steinbach Pistons||Nipawin Hawks||4–2||
|-
|2019 ||Portage Terriers||Battlefords North Stars|| 4–1||
|- align="center" bgcolor="#eeeeee"
|colspan=4 align=center rowspan=2 | 2020-2022: not awarded
|-
|}
|}

 Results by team results as of 2019 ANAVET Cup* denotes team is defunct or no longer part of the league

 Results by league results as of 2019 ANAVET Cup''

References

External links
MJHL website
SJHL website
CJHL website

Ice hockey in Western Canada
Ice hockey tournaments in Canada
Canadian Junior Hockey League trophies and awards